Shulak (also Romanized as Shūlak) is a village in Rudbar Rural District, in the Central District of Tafresh County, Markazi Province, Iran. At the 2006 census, its population was 57, in 21 families.

References 

Populated places in Tafresh County